Malayopython is a genus of constricting snakes in the family Pythonidae. The genus is native to India and Southeast Asia. It contains two species, both of which were previously classified within the genus Python. However, multiple studies recovered these species as distinct. Known as the "reticulatus clade", it was eventually found to be a sister lineage to a lineage giving rise to the Indo-Australian pythons rather than the genus Python.

Taxonomy
In 1975, American herpetologist Samuel Booker McDowell divided the genus Python into a "molurus group" and "reticulatus group" on the basis of differences in supralabial pits (shallow diagonal slits in the latter, square or triangular in the former) and infralabial pits (shallow and not in a groove in the former, in a groove in the latter), as well as differences in the ectopterygoid and hemipenis. He added New Guinea members of Liasis and Morelia to the reticulatus group. American zoologist Arnold G. Kluge performed a cladistics analysis on morphological characters and recovered a reticulatus lineage as a sister to the genus Python; hence not requiring a new generic name in 1993. In a 2004 genetics study using cytochrome b DNA, Robin Lawson and colleagues recovered the reticulated python as a sister to the Australo-Papuan pythons, rather than Python molurus and its relatives.

Raymond Hoser erected the genus Broghammerus  for the reticulated python in 2004, naming it after German snake expert Stefan Broghammer, on the basis of dorsal patterns distinct from those of the genus Python, and a dark mid-dorsal line from the rear to the front of the head, and red or orange (rather than brown) iris colour. In 2008, Lesley Rawlings and colleagues reanalysed Kruge's morphological data and combined them with genetic material, and found the reticulated clade to be an offshoot of the Australo-Papuan lineage, as well. They adopted and redefined the genus name Broghammerus. Reynolds and colleagues also confirmed the clade's place as a sister to the Australo-Papuan pythons and coined the name Malayopython, stating that the name Broghammerus was "invalid" due to it being "non-peer reviewed writing that included no formal data or analyses".  Reynolds and colleagues cite Kaiser and colleagues who state that, pending "suitable action" from the International Commission on Zoological Nomenclature (ICZN), the name Python should be used in preference of Broghammerus. In 2021, the ICZN reported that it found no basis under the provisions of the Code for regarding [Hoser's journal] as being "unpublished" (i.e. invalid).

Species

References

Snake genera
Pythonidae